Stremț is a commune of Alba County, in the Apuseni Mountains of Western Transylvania, Romania.

With a population of 2,418 (according to the 2011 census), the commune is composed of four villages: Fața Pietrii, Geomal, Geoagiu de Sus, and Stremț. 

The current mayor, re-elected in 2020, is Traian Ștefan Popa. In 2014, former King Michael I of Romania was declared honorary citizen of Stremț.

Natives
Daniel Nicula

References

External links

Communes in Alba County
13th-century establishments in Romania
Localities in Transylvania